The Green Hornet is a 1994 Hong Kong action film directed by Lam Ching Ying and starring Chin Ka-lok. Based on the American Green Hornet series the film focuses on the character of Kato.

Plot
The film follows the story of a Chinese reporter (Esther Kwan) as she seeks out the identity of a masked crime-fighter.

Cast
Kar Lok Chin as Dong The Green Hornet (Dressed as Kato)
Esther Kwan as Tom
Yu Rongguang as the police captain

References

External links
 
 

1994 martial arts films
1994 films
1990s Cantonese-language films
Hong Kong martial arts films
Chinese New Year films
1990s Hong Kong films